Dalcahue Channel (Spanish: "Canal de Dalcahue") is a body of water of the Sea of Chiloé that separates Quinchao Island from Chiloé Island, both part of the Chiloé Archipelago in southern Chile. The town of Dalcahue is located close to the narrowest part.

See also
 Fjords and channels of Chile

References

External links
 United States Hydrographic Office, South America Pilot (1916)

Chiloé Archipelago
Bodies of water of Los Lagos Region
Straits of Chile